James A. Briden served as Mayor of the City of East Providence, Rhode Island.  He has simultaneously worked as an attorney at Blais Cunningham & Crowe Chester, LLP.

Early life and education
James Briden attended middle school at The Gordon School in East Providence, graduated high school from Providence's Moses Brown School, and received a B.A. in economics from Boston College. Mr. Briden earned his law degree from the University of Arizona.

Mr. Briden passed the Rhode Island bar exam and, the following year, the Massachusetts bar exam.

Career

Law Practice
James Briden is a partner at Blais Cunningham & Crowe Chester, LLP.  His law practice includes immigration, bankruptcy, real estate, business, estate planning (wills), probate, and municipal/zoning law. Mr. Briden is a member of the American Immigration Lawyers Association.

City Solicitor 
Briden served as East Providence's city solicitor/attorney from 2008 to 2010.

City Council

Briden was sworn in December 5, 2016 as Mayor of the City of East Providence. He previously served as Mayor from 2012 to 2014.

References 

People from East Providence, Rhode Island
Politicians in East Providence, Rhode Island
Rhode Island lawyers
Rhode Island Democrats
Morrissey College of Arts & Sciences alumni
Living people
Moses Brown School alumni
Year of birth missing (living people)
James E. Rogers College of Law alumni